Moors Sports Club Ground is a first-class cricket ground in Colombo, the home ground of the Moors Sports Club.

Location
The ground is on Muttaiah Road and Braybrooke Place, near Beira Lake and Gangaramaya Temple, about one kilometre from the sea.

History
Moors Sports Club used the ground for many years before the first first-class matches were played there, in 1988-89, when Sri Lanka's domestic competition, the Lakspray Trophy, was granted first-class status. Since then it has been in constant use for first-class, List A and Twenty20 matches. While Moors play their home matches there, other teams also use the ground in Sri Lanka's domestic competitions.

As of early September 2020, 207 first-class matches and 111 List A matches had been played at the ground.

Five women's international matches have been played at the ground, all between Sri Lanka and Pakistan. Two of them took place in 1998, three in 2002. Three matches in the 2000 ICC Under-19 Cricket World Cup were played at the ground.

Records
The highest first-class score on the ground is 300 not out by Ramesh Mendis for Moors against Negombo in 2019-20. The best bowling figures are 9 for 38 by Manjula Munasinghe for Western Province North against Central Province in 1993-94.

References

External links
Moors Sports Club Ground at Cricinfo
Moors Sports Club Ground at CricketArchive

Cricket grounds in Colombo
Sport in Colombo